Bulgaria was a  cargo ship that was built as Empire Flamborough in 1945 by William Pickersgill & Sons Ltd, Sunderland, County Durham, United Kingdom for the Ministry of Transport (MoT). She was sold to Norway in 1946 and renamed Vindeggen. A further sale to Bulgaria in 1948 saw her renamed Bulgaria. She served until 1976 when she was scrapped.

Description
The ship was a cargo ship built in 1943 by William Pickersgill & Sons Ltd, Sunderland, County Durham, United Kingdom. She was yard number 277.

The ship was propelled by a   triple expansion steam engine, which had cylinders of 23½ inches (60 cm), 37½ inches (95 cm) and  diameter by  stroke. The engine was built by John Brown & Co Ltd, Clydebank, Renfrewshire. It drove a single screw propeller.

History
The ship was built by William Pickersgill & Sons Ltd, Sunderland, County Durham in 1943 for the MoT. She was launched on 19 November 1945 and completed in March 1946. Her port of registry was Sunderland. She was to have been placed under the management of Galbraith, Pembroke & Co Ltd, London.

Empire Flamborough was sold to Rederiet Vindeggen A/S of Norway for NOK4,900,000 and renamed Vindeggen. She was operated under the management of Christian Østberg. Her port of registry was Oslo. The Code Letters LLNP were allocated. In 1948, Vindeggen was sold for NOK6,262,000 to Navigation Maritime Bulgare, Bulgaria and was renamed Bulgaria. With the introduction of IMO Numbers in the late 1960s, Bulgaria was allocated the IMO Number 5054965. She served until 1976 when she was sold for scrapping at $65 per tonne. Bulgaria was scrapped by Brodospas at Split, Yugoslavia. Scrapping started in July 1976.

References

1945 ships
Ships built on the River Wear
Empire ships
Steamships of the United Kingdom
Merchant ships of the United Kingdom
Steamships of Norway
Merchant ships of Norway
Steamships of Bulgaria
Merchant ships of Bulgaria